Xenodiscus is an extinct ammonoid cephalopod genus and one of the earliest ceratites, found in the Upper Permian of northern India and Timor. Xenodiscus is included in the family Xenodiscidae which is part of the ceratite superfamily Xenodiscaceae

Xenodiscus has a thinly discoidal and ribbed shell with ceratitic sutures, coiled so all whorls are exposed. The whorl section is subquadrate and compressed, so as to be narrower than high.

References
 Arkell et al., 1957; Suborder Ceratitina in the Treatise on Invertebrate Paleontology Part L Ammonoidea; Geological Soc. of America and Univ Kansas press.

Ceratitida genera
Xenodiscidae
Ammonites of Asia
Permian ammonites